Kemetic may refer to:
A follower of modern Kemetism, or relating to it, egyptians  
Relating to Kemet, or Ancient Egypt
[north Africans]
Ancient Egyptian language

See also
Kemet (disambiguation)

Kemetism
Ancient Egypt